Vilda Mánnu is the second album by Finnish metal band Eternal Tears of Sorrow. It contains the band's first guest vocals (by Heli Luokkala, known from Nicepappi). It is also the last EToS album with their original line-up as one of the co-founders of the band, Olli-Pekka Törrö, left the band a few months after the release of this album.

The title of the album (as well as the name of the title song), Vilda Mánnu, is Northern Sami language and means "Wild Moon" in English. There is also another Sami song title on the album, Goashem, which (in the form "goas'kem") is Old Sami language for "an eagle".

Track listing

Credits

Band members 
 Altti Veteläinen − vocals, bass
 Jarmo Puolakanaho − guitar, keyboards
 Olli-Pekka Törrö − guitar, keyboards

Guest appearances 
 Heli Luokkala − female vocals (on tracks 5 and 6)

References

1998 albums
Eternal Tears of Sorrow albums